Mycenaean pottery is the pottery tradition associated with the Mycenaean period in Ancient Greece. It encompassed a variety of styles and forms including the stirrup jar. The term "Mycenaean" comes from the site Mycenae, and was first applied by Heinrich Schliemann.

Archaeology and Mycenaean pottery

Definitions

The archaeological code
The term "Mycenaean" has been imposed upon a matrix of abbreviational archaeological names, which amount to an archaeological code. This code had been standardized by various archaeological conventions. An archaeological name is the name given to a layer (or layers) at a site that is being professionally excavated. Archaeology depends on the fact that layers of types of soil and content accumulate over time, which undisturbed, can yield information about the various times. Typically an archaeological name identifies the site and the relative position of the layer. Predetermined knowledge of the layer provides information about the time and other circumstances of the artefacts found within it. Pottery is an especially good diagnostic of time period when found within a layer. It is not perfect or certain, however.

The custom of naming layers began with Heinrich Schliemann's excavations at Troy. He identified cities layered on top of one another: the first, the second, etc., starting at the bottom of the heap. These later became Troy I, Troy II, etc. Arthur Evans, excavator of Knossos and a friend of Schliemann's, followed this custom at Knossos; however, foreseeing that the layers there would likely be repeated elsewhere, he preferred the name "Minoan" (abbreviation M) over Knossos, as he believed that one of the high kings of Crete ruling from Knossos was the legendary King Minos. He also chose Minoan for the name of the civilization.

Subsequently, Carl Blegen, excavator of Pylos, who found the main cache of Linear B tablets on his legendary first day's dig, extended Evans' system to "Helladic" (adjective of Hellas, abbreviation H) and "Cycladic" (adjective of Cyclades, abbreviation C). The Cyclades are a specific number of islands in the Aegean Sea. Subsequently, by convention, following Evans, the layers were grouped and numbered: E, M, L for early, middle, and late, Roman numerals for the subdivision of each one of those, capital letters still further down, Arabic numerals, small letters, and after that if necessary descriptive terms. For example, LH IIIA2 means "Late Helladic, subperiod III, subperiod A, subperiod 2." There would always have to be at least two subperiods at each level, i.e., there cannot be a IIIA without at least a IIIB.

The rules are invariant. "Helladic" must refer to a site on the mainland. "Minoan" must mean Crete, and Cycladic must mean in the Cyclades; there are no exceptions. Islands such as Cyprus and Rhodes, not in any of the three code areas, were allowed their own systems, such as Cypriote I, Cypriote II, etc. It was then up to the archaeologists to match these layers to layers in the code.

The code has been institutionalized by such organizations as the British and American Schools at Athens. One archaeologist cannot arbitrarily change the convention. He can propose for consideration; typically, most proposals are not adopted. Individual art historians writing books often attempt to redefine the terms for their own works; for example, there has been a relatively current attempt to redefine "Helladic" by removing Peloponnesus from it and placing it in a supposed "Aegean" category, entirely ad hoc. In the code, the very core of "Helladic" is Mycenae and Pylos in the Peloponnesus. There is not much likelihood that the conventions of the major archaeologists will be redefined, so to speak, by rogue art historians.

Naming issues
The code per se does not allow for cross-assemblages; that is, artefacts that turn up in more than one defined area, such as Minoan pottery at Akrotiri. Anything found at Akrotiri is Cycladic, not Minoan. The  meaning, of course, is "Cycladic pottery like Minoan pottery." It does not help to hypothesize that the Akrotiri Minoan pottery is imported. Until recently, there was no way to know whether it was imported or not, all statements being suppositional. Evans supposed Mycenaean pottery was from Crete. The archaeologists had recourse to culture names such as "Mycenaean" and "Minoan", and could speak with meaning about the Mycenaean pottery of Cyprus. Strictly speaking, Cyprus had none, only Cypriote pottery. Helladic pottery could never turn up anywhere else but mainland Greece, except for the uncertain rescue concept of importation. Late Mycenaean pottery could be LH, LC, LM, or anywhere else it was found, without any implication of provenance. "Mycenaean" meant the cultural style. In his 1941 work, The Mycenaean Pottery: Analysis and Classification, a widely used handbook, the Swedish archaeologist, Arne Furumark, attempted to redefine LH and LC as a bona fide archaeological term: Mycenaean I, Mycenaean II, etc., but without general success. The preference is for LH and LC; however, "Mycenaean" remains in use as a general term. Some archaeologists drop the Helladic, etc.,and use "Mycenaean" with the same subperiod numbering: Mycenaean I, II, III, etc.

Dating issues
The main issues with the code are inadvertent due to the nature of the method. The layer names represent only relative sequences: before and after some other layer, or first in the order, second, etc. There is no internal tie to a larger scheme, such as a calendar date on any calendar, ancient or modern. Due to Evans' synchronization of EM, MM, and LM with Egyptian chronology, all the Is, IIs and IIIs were originally assumed to be coterminous, but it soon became obvious that they could not be coterminous at every location, e.g., an IA calendar date might not be the same on Crete as on the mainland.

The archaeologists were not free, however, to reinvent the periods.  The typology of the layers must remain the same regardless of whether it was before or after its parallel type in some other region. If there was no parallel type, i.e., if different civilizations were being compared, such as Trojan and Mycenaean, then the synchronization of the layers was critical in understanding events that related to them both; for example, exactly which Troy fought the Mycenaean Greeks in the Trojan War? Selection of the wrong one would result in serious historical error.

It was obvious that more had to be done to provide calendar, or "absolute" dates. The process is ongoing. The best hope is perhaps radiocarbon dating of wooden artefacts in the layer. However, it is not precise enough to capture the time of the periods exactly. A second method where available is dendrochronology (tree-ring dating). A master sequence of tree rings has been composed in cases where enough wood to display rings has survived. The chronology is still uncertain enough to result in multiple schemes proposed by different archaeologists.

History of the concept of ceramic Mycenaeans
Archaeologists use changes in pottery styles as an indication of broader changes in culture. If the pottery style was continuous, they presumed a continuous culture, and if the pottery changed suddenly, then so did the culture, it was thought. Inevitably in such a hypothesis the pottery names and concepts acquired burdens of meaning that for the most part had nothing to do with pottery. They became historical terms of general culture.

Origin of the ceramic
Many writers compare prehistory to a stage on which different ceramic characters appear and play a role. The first of the ceramic characters were the Mycenaeans, whom Schliemann brought into existence in the first excavations of Mycenae. It was 1876. Schliemann has already tried his hand at excavating Troy (1871–1873), with Frank Calvert, scion of the family that owned the land at Hisarlik, Turkey, suspected site of Troy. Schliemann and his wife, Sophie, found a treasure in gold there, before he and Calvert had a falling-out. Their joint excavation could not continue. They escaped from Troy, smuggling out the treasure, much to the chagrin of the Ottoman government, which sued for a share, amidst allegations that he and Calvert had worked a fraud for the publicity. Permission to dig was cancelled. Shadows of the scandal live on.

Schliemann applied for permission to dig at Mycenae. The Archaeological Society of Athens was willing to sponsor him, but the Greek government insisted on sending an ephor, Panagiotis Stamatakis, to make certain that no skullduggery was afoot. Schliemann wasted no time. Hiring 125 diggers and 4 carts he excavated Mycenae in a single year, 1876, publishing Mycenae in 1878. It contained all his notes from 1876. As it turned out, more treasure was discovered, as equally contextually unlikely as the treasure from Troy, but validated by Stamatakis, clearing Schliemann's name. A certain perverse element of the yellow journals subsequently put forward similar wild tales of him and Sophie sneaking around in the dark to place the treasure, but the legitimate world of archaeology accepted the findings. His permission to excavate in Turkey was restored on his settling the suit. After he finished Mycenae he went back to Troy. By then he had learned the value of the ceramics as "index pottery", where before he had used dynamite to get through difficult layers.

Stamatakis' endorsement cleared the path for general acceptance of Schliemann's work. Gladstone's Preface to Mycenae pointed out that previously the architecture in the Argolid was being called "Cyclopean", after the myth of the Cyclopes who built with large stones. In the book, Schliemann refers to Cyclopean walls, houses, bridges, roads, and the architects. When he refers to the portable art and its manufacturers, he calls them Mycenaean. The Mycenaeans were thus born from Cyclopean parentage. When it came to pottery, Schliemann went a step further than the adjective, turning it into an abstract noun:"fragments of the usual Mycenaean pottery", "spatial ornamentation characteristic of Mycenaean art," and especially concerning the collection viewed by the king of Greece, who came to visit at his request, "the large collection of prehistoric Mycenaean antiquities produced by my excavations." "Mycenaean" thenceforward was a type of artefact, not just items found at Mycenae.

In search of the Mycenaean horizon
Schliemann had had created a culture name from his excavations at Mycenae and the conviction that the Cyclopean architecture in evidence there and at Tiryns was the work of the legendary civilization depicted in the Iliad and reflected in the Greek myths. In Mycenae he had transitioned from a general culture name to specific collections of artefacts: Mycenaean sculpture, Mycenaean jewelry, Mycenaean pottery, etc. According to the principle of archaeological uniformitarianism, adopted in the genesis of cultural archaeology from geological archaeology, if Mycenaean is not just a place name, there ought to be an archaeological horizon, Mycenaean, of which the assemblage, Mycenaean pottery, is the indicator. The collection at Mycenae then would only be one instance of a horizon and an assemblage located at numerous as yet unexcavated locations. The first step in finding them would be a clear definition of what they are. Schliemann and the contemporary archaeologists thus began a grand phase of search and definition for the Mycenaean horizon.

Two younger friends of Schliemann, Adolf Furtwängler and Georg Loeschcke, who had assisted him in the excavation of Olympia, shortly took on the task of classifying the pottery he had discovered, publishing the results in Mykenische Thongfässe in 1879, only a year after Mycenae. It was the first known handbook of Mycenaean pottery. As there were no existing guidelines on which to improve, the two were forced to rely on classical standards of color and pattern (e.g., red-figure, black-figure, etc.). The main criterion was the color of the pattern. In type 1 the pattern was black; type 2, predominantly black, some red; type 3, predominantly red, some black; type 4, only red (the scheme was later abandoned). In 1879 the archaeologists looked confidently forward to seeing the scheme at every further excavation of Mycenaean pottery.

The major test came all too swiftly with the excavation of Phylakopi on the island of Melos, 1896-1899, by the British School at Athens. Some of the major archaeologists were there, especially those who were to play a significant role later at Knossos: Evans, Hogarth, and Duncan MacKenzie, supervisor of excavation, who would later serve in that capacity for Evans on Crete. Phylakopi was first founded on bedrock. The initial city was overlain by a second, and that by a third, hence Phylakopi I, II, III. The pottery section of the report was written by Campbell Cowan Edgar. By the time he finished writing in 1904, Evans was already at Knossos, and his topic was obsolete. The Mycenaean horizon seemed even further away than ever.

The classification of Phylakopi pottery was a monumental task right from the first. Edgar reports that during the excavation seasons some 10,000 - 20,000 fragments per day were being excavated and hauled away in bushel baskets. When the sorting was finally done two general classes had emerged, the earliest being Phylakopi I, termed geometric ware from its simple geometric patterns. The term "Cycladic" was loosely used to mean this type. In contrast to it an entirely new type appeared in the middle of Phylakopi II and soon predominated. It bore some resemblance to pottery of the Argolid. Leaping at the chance, the archaeologists classified it as Mycenaean, a move they would soon regret. Its diversity was far greater than that of Argolid pottery, and its beginning and end elusive. Edgar complained: "we must draw the line somewhere, unless the term (Mycenaean) is to cover the whole prehistoric culture of Greece." Throughout his report he seems to be struggling to describe indefinite numbers of patterns without any simple themes. Turning to Furtwängler and Loeschcke he devised the following scheme:

 In the first phase, black matte decoration is the only style to be found. Popular motifs are straight bands, spirals, birds and fish.
 Red and brown lustrous decoration come into play alongside black matte in this phase. Birds and fish are still popular, and we start to see flowers painted on wares as well.
 In this phase both red and brown lustrous and black matte are still around, but the lustrous decorations have surpassed the matte in popularity. The flower becomes much more popular.
 Red/Black and Red lustrous are still seen in this final phase, and black matte has completely disappeared. Shape and decorative motifs do not change much during this phase.

Falling in the uncertain period between Phylakopi and Knossos, the scheme was released to the public as Phylakopian Mycenaean. That it was not. It was the inconclusive and unfinished work of Edgar. His standard for being Mycenaean was contemporaneity with the pottery in the Argolid; i.e., despite the great diversity of the pottery, the only ceramic identity available on which to pin it was "Mycenaean." This deficit was increasingly unsatisfactory to all the archaeologists at Phylakopi. Moreover, the supposed Mycenaean pottery represented a break with the preceding Cycladic. According to the prevailing standard, it must have arrived on Phylakopi by either invasion or importation from somewhere else. Edgar resisted this view at first.

Assigning Phases I and II to Phylakopi II, Edgar attempted to make a case that it evolved from the earlier geometric by a sort of "freeing" of the patterns from repetitive geometric forms to obtain a "looser system." He called it "early Mycenaean" (as opposed to geometric "pre-Mycenaean"). Phases 3 and 4 were to be assigned entirely to Phylakopi III. They were termed "The Later Local Pottery of the Mycenaean Period." Edgar concedes that they were swimming in deeper waters, so to speak, than originally planned. He makes a noble effort to connect Phase 3 with the geometric, but the complexities of Phase 4 are far beyond his comparisons. He gives up, remarking "The fourth and final stage of the Phylakopi settlement is marked by predominance of imported Mycenaean ware ...," which reflects a general realization by the British School that Phylakopi does not contain the answer to the riddle of Mycenaean provenance. They decide to abandon Phylakopi in favor of the most likely source of the imports, Crete.

The Cretan Mycenaeans
Foreseeing the end, Arthur Evans and his younger friend and protégé, David George Hogarth, left the excavation at Phylakopi early. Not much could be done at Crete, as the Ottoman Empire was not giving permission to excavate there. Evans went home to tend to the Ashmolean and other affairs while Hogarth investigated Crete. While on a recreational tour in northern Italy Evans' beloved wife died unexpectedly of poor health. For a year he was totally lost, wandering dejectedly around the Mediterranean. In 1899 he received a cable from his young friend to come at once, as the political situation in Crete was changing rapidly. Crete was breaking away from the Ottomans with the support of the British Empire. After it became independent it would seek admission to Greece. Suddenly becoming his old self, Evans arrived in Heraklion as a journalist again, investigating everything, becoming a thorn in everyone's side. The last Turkish troops were ferried off the island by the British fleet. The  new government was issuing permissions to excavate. Evans was first in line, so to speak. At Hogarth's suggestion he acquired land at Knossos, and in a grand style reminiscent of Schliemann's, led an army of Greek diggers there to excavate. MacKenzie was called from Phylakopi to superintend. Hogarth, not entirely at ease with Evans as commander, left the scene after the first year.

Knossos was excavated 1900-1905. The site survives today mainly because of a decision made by Evans to restore it, not a total rebuilding, but an enhancement here and there for safety purposes. Hiring an architect (D.T. Fyfe), he shored up crumbling walls, re-cemented patios, replaced pillars, put collapsed ceilings back in place, and so on. Today's tourist site, which must be maintained every year, is the result. Much of the larger storage pottery was put back in place. Evans went so far as to hire an artist to reconstruct frescoes from fallen pieces. These practices are criticised by some, lauded by others. True, the palace is not exactly as Evans found it. It is verisimilar. On the other hand, neither was the destroyed palace (it burned) the same over the entire Mycenaean Period.

Evans actually owned the site, supported in this by his father and his family wealth. He was nevertheless a partisan of the British School, to whom he left the site in his will (it is now managed by the Greek government). They had gone a step further than Schliemann in investigating the full extent of Mycenaean uniformitarianism. If the Achaeans ruled the islands, they thought, then Mycenaean pottery should be excavatable there. This expectation had only been partly satisfied by their excavation of Phylakopi. Edgar calls the earlier pottery sometimes "Cycladic" and sometimes "Aegean," meaning the actual Aegean Sea. The later pottery was a virtual "type x" with no explanation. Evans went to Knossos in the expectation of elucidating "type x" (which turned out to be "Minoan"). He hoped to be able to recreate a family tree, with branches of mainland, Cycladic, and "type x" on it. According to this pre-conceived expectation he had to find two common ancestors, one for Cretan-Cycladic, and one for Cretan-Mycenaean, an expectation that Wace later called his "pan-Minoan theories,". He was to devise a new term for the first, "Aegean." He regarded "Mycenaean" as a local development of "Minoan."

At Knossos, the British archaeologists were beginning work on a site generally considered "Mycenaean" by other professional site visitors. Surface finds supported this view. A palace appeared to be in the layer closest to the surface. For nine weeks of the next six months, February–June, 1900, the British performed an amazing feat, clearing two acres of the top layer, and uncovering all the major features of the site. They brought in British tools, such as the wheelbarrow, and hired as many men as were necessary, insuring harmony by selecting as many Christians as Ottomans, and treating them all equally. They lovingly named each room and feature with colorful names appropriate to the finds there.

The prediction concerning the horizon of the latest layer turned out to be correct; a palace had come to view, which could be identified by its pottery as indubitably Mycenaean, according to the handbook of Furtwängler and Loeschke. The confirmation was a liberal presence of an old Mycenaean friend, the stirrup jar. Schliemann had discovered it in Troy VI, but it appeared more regularly in mainland Mycenaean sites. The Trojan presence was attributed to importation.

To the ample Mycenaean material at Knossos was added a new script and the confirmation of an old. In the "Room of the Chariot Tablets" some wooden boxes had been smashed open spilling a cache of inscribed, hardened clay tablets. This writing Evans termed "a linear form of script." By that he meant to oppose it to another, more rarely testified script, which he called "hieroglyphic," defined as a "conventional pictographic class." He had previously been a student of Cretan signatories. He explained his new term by saying "Unlike the regular arrangement of the linear script in separate lines from right to left, these hieroglyphic characters ... present a much more jumbled aspect."

Origin of the ceramic Minoans
In the summary for the first year's excavation, Evans remarks: "In spite of the complicated arrangement of some parts of the Palace, a great unity prevails throughout the main lines of its ground-plan." It was the relative disunity, the "complicated arrangement," with which he was now to concern himself, which created the Minoans and brought them to center stage. Previously in the report he had pointed to "certain later modifications of the original plan." This original plan, a previous unity, came to the fore now. He said: "various evidences are at hand of the transformation or remodelling of individual chambers," such as walls of gypsum blocks.

In short, Evans had discovered archaeologically a "first palace" under the Mycenaean, which was now the "second palace." Deep test pits to the virgin soil under the hill had revealed many meters of Neolithic habitation; i.e., before the "Palace Period,", the Neolithic people had an ancient city at that location (modern studies have shown it to have been the most ancient city of the Mediterranean). At the start of the Palace Period, the entire top of the hill was made level. In some areas the Neolithic is succeeded by the Mycenaean. In others another layer intervenes.

Hogarth, who had been assigned to excavate houses on the periphery, in the "town," found that the clearance was general; moreover, that the layer of the first palace, which was directly under the houses (instead of the Neolithic), contained extensive debris, including the mysterious Kamares ware. At Phylakopi the British had not known how to classify it. It went down as being the unknown pottery, Type x, to be clarified in Crete. Now it was in the first palace layer, which Evans termed at that time "the Kamares period." In addition, many blocks of the first palace were incised with the sign of the double axe, which Evans called "the special badge of the old Cretan and Carian divinity the god of the labrys, of Labranda, and the labyrinth.

The word most often used in Evans' report on the first season to mean the time before the Mycenaeans is pre-Mycenaean. The ceramics were so different that the Mycenaean pottery seemed to have been imported from the mainland. At Phylakopi the archaeologists had had only one class available to them into which to stuff a great diversity of ceramics: "Mycenaean." Now the two classes were not enough; Evans was having to resort to such terminology as "the latest pre-Mycenaean period." Over the winter he decided to apply a solution he had already formulated for the classification of scripts. The linear writing, he had established, was Mycenaean. It supplanted the hieroglyphic script and was associated with a general change of culture, which could be interpreted as an ethnic invasion and appropriation of the Knossos region. At first Evans called the culture of the hieroglyphs "prae-Mycenaean."

At the end of his treatise on the topic he redefined the latter to "Minoan" based on a re-examination of the historical legends. Herodotus claimed to be narrating the fate of the Cretans under their king, Minos, as related by the Eteocretans ("true Cretans") of Praesos in eastern Crete. Minos led a large part of the population around the Knossos region to an attempted colonization of Sicily. The Sicanian natives resisted. Minos was killed in battle. Attempting to escape the Cretans found they could not get home and settled in southern Italy instead. Meanwhile, Greeks from Thessaly and "men of various nations" took advantage of the depopulation to settle and appropriate the Knossos region.

The tale seemed to have all the elements required to solve Evans' nomenclature problem. If the resettlement of Knossos was by Mycenaeans, then the reign of Minos was pre-Mycenaean. Taking "Minos" to be a dynastic name, such as Pharaoh or Caesar, Evans felt justified in replacing "prae-Mycenaean" by "Minoan." Such a view would imply that the Mycenaeans were Hellenic. Not quite ready for that step, Evans seized on the "various nations" to suggest that the linear script was "prae-Phoenician," thus falling short of Schliemann's prophecy and missing the decipherment of the century, as some of the linear script was surely Greek, and there must have been Greeks at Knossos. In his account for the second season, he now distinguished everywhere between "Minoan" and "Mycenaean" features of the palace, and writes of the Minoan palace (the first) and the Mycenaean Palace (the second). The sources also gave him a date. Eusebius dates the Greek settlement to 1415 BC. He was on the verge of great discoveries himself and would shortly present the Minoan civilization to the world.

Helladic periodization

Mycenaean pottery was produced from c. 1600 BC to c. 1000 BC by Mycenaean Greek potters. It is divided by some archaeologists into four major phases.

Mycenaeans rose in prominence around 1600 BC and stayed in control of Greece until about 1100 BC. Evidence shows that they spoke an early form of Greek. They took control of Crete c. 1450 BC.  The collapse of Mycenaean Greece states was followed by the Greek Dark Ages

Much of the finest Mycenaean pottery used or adapted styles from the very well-established tradition of Minoan pottery, especially in areas closer to Crete.  Conversely, an abundance of Mycenaean pottery is found in Italy and Sicily, suggesting that they were in contact and traded with the Mycenaeans.

Early Mycenaean
There is some question as to how much of the pottery of this age relies on Minoan pottery for both their shapes and the patterns. For at least the first half of the seventeenth century BC there is only a small portion of all pottery produced that is in the Minoan style.

LH I-IIA pottery can be distinguished by the use of a more lustrous paint than the predecessors. While this is more common during this age, there was a considerable amount of pottery produced in the Middle Helladic period style, using matte paints and middle Helladic shapes.

Where the first recognizably Mycenaean pottery emerged is still under debate. Some believe that this development took place in the northeast Peloponnese (probably in the vicinity of Mycenae). There is also evidence that suggests that the style appeared in the southern Peloponnese (probably Lanconia) as a result of the Minoan potters taking up residence at coastal sites along the Greek Mainland.

LH I (c. 1675/1650 – 1600/1550 BC)
The pottery during this period varies greatly in style from area to area. Due to the influence of Minoan Crete, the further south the site, the more the pottery is influenced by Minoan styles.

The easiest way to distinguish the pottery of this period from that of the late Middle Helladic is the use of a fine ware that is painted in a dark-on-light style with lustrous paints. This period also marks the appearance of a fine ware that is coated all over with paint varying from red and black in color. This ware is monochrome painted and is directly descended from grey and black Minyan ware (which disappear during LH I). A form of the yellow Minyan style also appears in this period, merging into Mycenaean unpainted wares.

Additionally, Mycenaean art is different from that of the Minoans in that the different elements of a work are distinguished from each other much more clearly, whereas Minoan art is generally more fluid.

There is also some carry-over of matte-painted wares from the Middle Helladic period into LH I. The majority of large closed vessels that bear any painted decorations are matte. They are generally decorated in two styles of matte paints known as Aeginetan Dichrome and Mainland Polychrome.

Some of the preferred shapes during this period were the vapheio cup, semi globular cup, alabastron, and piriform jar.

LH IIA (c. 1600/1550 – 1490/1470 BC)
During this period there is a drastic increase in the amount of fine pottery that is decorated with lustrous paints. An increase in uniformity in the Peloponnese (both in painting and shape) can be also seen at this time. However, Central Greece is still defined by Helladic pottery, showing little Minoan influence at all, which supports the theory that Minoan influence on ceramics traveled gradually from south to north.

By this period, matte-painted pottery is much less common and the Grey Minyan style has completely disappeared. In addition to the popular shapes of LH I goblets, jugs, and jars have increased in popularity.

Middle Mycenaean

During this phase, Minoan civilization slowly decreased in importance and eventually the Mycenaeans rose in importance, possibly even temporarily being in control of the Cretan palace of Knossos. The mainland pottery began to break away from Minoan styles and Greek potters started creating more abstract pottery as opposed to the previously naturalistic Minoan forms. This abstract style eventually spread to Crete as well.

LH IIB (c. 1490/1470 – 1435/1405 BC)
During this period the most popular style was the Ephyraean style; most commonly represented on goblets and jugs. This style is thought to be a spin-off of the Alternating style of LM IB. This style has a restricted shape range, which suggests that potters may have used it mostly for making matching sets of jugs, goblets and dippers.

It is during LH IIB that the dependence on Minoan ceramics is completely erased. In fact, looking at the pottery found on Crete during this phase suggests that artistic influence is now flowing in the opposite direction; the Minoans are now using Mycenaean pottery as a reference.

Ivy, lilies, and nautili are all popular patterns during this phase and by now there is little to no matte painting.

LH IIIA1 (c. 1435/1405 – 1390/1370 BC)
During LH IIIA1, there are many stylistic changes. Most notably, the Mycenaean goblet begins to lengthen its stem and have a more shallow bowl. This stylistic change marks the beginning of the transformation from goblet to kylix. The vapheio cup also changes into an early sort of mug and becomes much rarer. Also during this period, the stirrup jar becomes a popular style and naturalistic motifs become less popular.

Palatial Period
Not long after the beginning of this phase there is evidence of major destruction at the palace at Knossos on Crete. The importance of Crete and Minoan power decreases and Mycenaean culture rises in dominance in the southern Aegean. It was during this period that the Levant, Egypt and Cyprus came into close and continuous contact with the Greek world. Masses of Mycenaean pottery found in excavated sites in the eastern Mediterranean show that not only were these ancient civilizations in contact with each other, but also had some form of established trade.

The Koine style (from Greek koinos = "common") is the style of pottery popular in the first three quarters of this era. This form of pottery is thus named for its intense technical and stylistic uniformity, over a large area of the eastern and central Mediterranean. During LH IIIA it is virtually impossible to tell where in Mycenaean Greece a specific vase was made. Pottery found on the islands north of Sicily is almost identical to that found in Cyprus and the Levant.        
It is only during the LH IIIB period that stylistic uniformity decreased; around the same time that the amount of trade between the Peloponnese and Cyprus dramatically decreased.

LH IIIA2 (c. 1390/1370 – 1320/1300 BC)
It is in this period that the kylix truly becomes the dominant shape of pottery found in settlement deposits. The stirrup jar, piriform jar, and alabastron are the shapes most frequently found in tombs from this era.
Also during LH IIIA2 two new motifs appear: the whorl shell and LH III flower. These are both stylized rather than naturalistic, further separating Mycenaean pottery from Minoan influence.

Excavations at Tell el-Amarna in Egypt have found large deposits of Aegean pottery. These findings provide excellent insight to the shape range (especially closed forms) of Mycenaean pottery. By this time, monochrome painted wares were almost exclusively large kylikes and stemmed bowls while fine unpainted wares are found in a vast range of shapes.

LH IIIB (c. 1320/1300 – 1190 BC)
The presence of the deep bowl as well as the conical kylix in this age is what allows one to differentiate from LH IIIA. During LH IIIB paneled patterns also appear. Not long into this phase the deep bowl becomes the most popular decorated shape, although for unpainted wares the kylix is still the most produced.

One can further distinguish the pottery from this period into two sub-phases:
 LH IIIB1: this phase is characterized by an equal presence of both painted deep bowls and kylikes. The kylikes at this time are mostly Zigouries.
 LH IIIB2: during this phase there is an absence of decorates kylikes and deep bowl styles further develop into the Rosette form.

It is unknown how long each sub-phase lasted, but by the end of LH IIIB2 the palaces of Mycenae and Tiryns and the citadel at Midea had all been destroyed. The palace of Pylos was also destroyed at some point during this phase, but it is impossible to tell when in relation to the others the destruction took place.

Post-palatial period
During this period, the differences in ceramics from different regions become increasingly more noticeable, suggesting further degradation of trade at this time. Other than a brief 'renaissance' period that took place mid-twelfth century that brought some developments, the pottery begins to deteriorate. This decline continues until the end of LH IIIC, where there is no place to go but up in terms of technical and artistic pottery.

The shapes and decorations of the ceramics discovered during this final period show that the production of pottery was reduced to little more than a household industry, suggesting that this was a time of poverty in Greece.

It is possible to divide this phase into several different sub-phases.

Early phase
At this time, the 'medium band' form of deep bowl appears and most painted shapes in this phase have linear decoration. Occasionally new shapes (like the 'carinated cup') and new decorations appear, helping to distinguish wares from this period from those of earlier phases.

Around the same time as the destruction of the great palaces and citadels is recovered an odd class of handmade pottery lacking any ancestry in the Mycenaean world. Similar pottery is also found in other areas both to the East (e.g. Troy, Cyprus and Lebanon) and to the West (Sardinia and Southern Italy). Most of the scholars in recent times agree that such a development is probably to be interpreted as the result of long-range connections with the Central Mediterranean area (and in particular with southern Italy), and some have connected this with the appearance in the Eastern Mediterranean of the so-called Sea Peoples

Developed phase
In this sub-phase there is increased development in pattern painted pottery. Scenes of warriors (both foot soldiers and on chariots) become more popular. The majority of the developments however are representational motifs in a variety of regional styles:

Late phase
There is very little pottery found during this phase, thus not providing much information. It is clear, however, that the bountiful decorations of the developed phase are no longer around. When patterns did occur in this phase, they were very simple; most of the pottery was decorated with a simple band or a solid coat of paint.

Mycenaean pottery as commodities

Manufacture
The earliest form of the potter's wheel was developed in the Near East around 3500 BC. This was then adopted by the people of Mesopotamia who later altered the performance of the wheel to make it faster. Around 2000 years later, during the Late Helladic period, Mycenaeans adopted the wheel.

The idea behind the pottery wheel was to increase the production of pottery. The wheels consisted of a circular platform, either made of baked clay, wood or terracotta and were turned by hand; the artist usually had an assistant that turned the wheel while he molded the clay.

Clay is dug from the ground, checked for impurities and placed on the wheel to be molded. Once the potter gets the shape he desires, the potter stops the wheel, allowing the excess water to run off. The artist then spins it again to ensure the water is off then it is placed in a kiln. The kiln was usually a pit dug in the ground and heated by fire; these were estimated to reach a temperature of 950 degree Celsius (1,742 degree Fahrenheit). Later kilns were built above ground to be easier to maintain and ventilate. During the firing of the pottery, artists went through a three-phase firing in order to achieve the right colour (further reading).

Many historians question how Mycenaean potter's developed the technique of glossing their pottery. Some speculate that there is an "elite or a similar clay mineral in a weak solution" of water. This mixture is then applied to the pottery and placed in the kiln to set the surface. Art Historians suggest that the "black areas on Greek pots are neither pigment nor glaze but a slip of finely sifted clay that originally was of the same reddish clay used."

Considering the appearance of the pottery, many Mycenaean fragments of pottery that have been uncovered, has indicated that there is colour to the pottery. Much of this colouring comes from the clay itself; pigments are absorbed from the soil. Vourvatsi pots start off with a pink clay "due merely to long burial in the deep red soil of the Mesmogia". "The colours of the clay vary from white and reds to yellows and browns. The result of the pottery is due to the effects of the kiln; this ties in the three-phases of firing."

Phase One: Oxidizing. Oxygen is added to the kiln, thus creates the slip and pot to turn red
Phase Two: Reducing. The shutter in the kiln is closed, reducing the amount of oxygen the pottery receives, this causes both the slip and pot to turn black.
Phase Three: Re-oxidizing. Oxygen is then released back into the kiln, causing the coarser material to turn red and the smother silica-laden slip to remain black.

Production centers
The two main production centers during Mycenaean times were Athens and Corinth. Attributing pottery to these two cities is done based on two distinct and different characteristics: shapes (and color) and detailed decoration.

In Athens the clay fired rich red and decorations tended towards the geometric style. In Corinth the clay was light yellow in color and they got their motifs from more natural inspirations.

Anatomy

The anatomy of a vessel can be separated into three distinct parts: orifice, body and base. There are many different shapes depending on where the vessel was made, and when.

The body is the area between the orifice (opening) and base (bottom). The maximum diameter of a vessel is usually at the middle of the body or a bit higher. There are not many differences in the body; the shape is pretty standard throughout the Mycenaean world.

The orifice is mouth of the vessel, and is subject to many different embellishments, mostly for functional use. The opening is further divided into two categories:
Unrestricted: an unrestricted orifice is when the opening is equal to or greater than the maximum diameter.
Restricted: contrarily, is when the opening is less than the maximum diameter.

The space between the orifice and the body can be divided into two specific shapes:
Neck: a restriction of the opening that is above the maximum diameter.
Collar: an extension of the opening that does not reduce the orifice.

The base is the underside of the vessel. It is generally flat or slightly rounded so that it can rest on its own, but certain wares (especially of the elite variety) have been known to be extremely rounded or pointed.

Utilization of pottery
There are many different and distinct forms of pottery that can have either very specific or multi-functional purposes. The majority of forms, however are for holding or transporting liquids.

The form of a vessel can help determine where it was made, and what it was most likely used for. Ethnographic analogy and experimental archaeology have recently become popular ways to date a vessel and discover its function.

Analysis of function

Vessel function can be broken down into three main categories: storage, transformation/processing and transfer. These three categories can be further broken down by asking questions such as: 
hot or cold?
liquid or dry?
frequency of transactions?
duration of use?
distance carried

The main problem with pottery is that it is very fragile. While well-fired clay is virtually indestructible in terms of decay, if bumped or dropped it will shatter. Other than this, it is very useful in keeping rodents and insects out and as it can be set directly into a fire it is very popular.

There are a few different classes of pottery, generally separated into two main sections: utilitarian and elite. Utilitarian pottery is generally plainwares, sometimes with decorations, made for functional, domestic use, and constitutes the bulk of the pottery made. Elite pottery is finely made and elaborately decorated with great regard for detail. This form of pottery is generally made for holding precious liquids and for decoration.

Throughout the different phases of Mycenaean pottery different shapes have risen and fallen in prominence. Others evolve from previous forms (for example, the Kylix (drinking cup) evolved from the Ephyraean goblet).

There are many different shapes of pottery found from the Mycenaean world. They can serve very specific tasks or be used for different purposes. Some popular uses for pottery at this time are: saucepans, storage containers, ovens, frying pans, stoves, cooking pots, drinking cups and plates.

Documented types
Ancient pottery differs from modern in the fundamental prevalence of utilitarian intent. Where a potter or glass-blower today would spend time creating ceramics or glassware that are individual works of art, or a small class of elite decorative ware, which have no other purpose than display as art, and serving as a repository of stored wealth, the ancient Greeks and Romans seldom had resources to spend on that sort of craftsmanship. They concentrated instead on the mass production of pottery for sale to the general population, either locally, or after export. Thus standard utilitarian types developed, as described above.

Typology is best known from the Iron Age, when histories were written, and stories were told pictorially on the pots themselves. In classical Greece a vocabulary of pottery types developed. There were amphorae for transport, pithoi for storage, kraterai for mixing wine, kylikes for drinking it, and so on. The words bring to mind certain well-defined images. The pottery is easy to identify. The clarity is far different for the types of the Bronze Age. Good guesses can be made about the functions of some of these types. In the absence of the native names, they have been labelled with classical names reflective of the best guesses as to their functions.

The historian is not entirely in the dark about the names and functions of this pottery. Mycenaean accountants have left records in Linear B on clay tablets of names of the pots and their contents in their or their employers' possession. The main difficulty in understanding native concepts is the uncertainty concerning the referents. The pots still lie about in large quantities, or did before excavation, in the rooms of the palaces that were destroyed. Matching the observed types to the names in the documents remains an ongoing task.

Ventris and Chadwick listed 14 types of pottery ideogram, numbers 200-213, whose presence in a tablet signified a record of the pottery on the shelf. These ideograms are not exact representations of real pottery, but are only verisimilar symbols. A few, such as the stirrup jar, can easily be matched to a type still extant. Most cannot be, but are subject to debate. There are usually variants of each one. The Linear B nouns are given. Some remain unknown or possibly incomplete. Others are obviously the prototypes of Iron Age names. There is no guarantee, however, that the pottery remained the same during the interim.

Numbers 200-208 are qualified in the tablets with the BRONZE ideogram, signifying that they were of metal. Apparently the same form was often used for metal as for terracotta. The ideograms are included here for that reason, with terracotta possible instances. The table below displays representative instances of the ideograms and includes possible matches in the real pottery. Usually exact matches are not considered possible, but in a few instances, such as the easily identifiable stirrup jar, there is clarity.

Other types known from archaeology
The possible types associated with the Linear B documents do not cover all the pottery found in the palaces. There are a few possible reasons: perhaps only some jars got recorded, or perhaps the ideograms are more general than known. Faced with uncertainty the theorists naturally applied classical names to them. There is no guarantee that the Mycenaean pots have the same or similar functions as the classical ones, or that the classical names exist in Linear B form. As with the ideograms, some types are clearly represented by prototypes in the Bronze Age; others are only guesswork.

Some shapes with specific functions are:
Stamnos: a wine jar
Krateriskos: miniature mixing bowl
Aryballos, Lekythoi, Alabastra: for holding precious liquids

Many shapes can be used for a variety of things, such as jugs (oinochoai) and cups (kylikes). Some, however, have very limited uses; such as the kyathos which is used solely to transfer wine into these jugs and cups.

Ephyrean goblet
This goblet is the finest product of a Mycenaean potter's craft. It is a stout, short stemmed goblet that is Cretan in origin with Mycenaean treatment. Its decoration is confined to the center of each side and directly under the handles.

Stirrup jar
The stirrup jar is used for storage and transportation, most commonly of oil and wine that was invented in Crete. Its body can be globular, pear-shaped or cylindrical. The top has a solid bar of clay shaped in two stirrup handles and a spout.

Alabastron
The alabastron is the second most popular shape (behind the stirrup jar). It is a squat jar with two to three ribbon-handles at the opening.

Decoration of Mycenaean pottery
Artists used a variety of tools to engrave designs and pictures onto the pottery. Most of the tools used were made up of stones, sticks, bones and thin metal picks. Artists used boar-hair brushes and feathers used to distribute the sifted clay evenly on the pottery.

Geometric style
The geometric style of decorating pottery has been popular since Minoan times. Although it did decrease in abundance for some time, it resurfaced c. 1000 BC. This form of decoration consists of light clay and a dark, lustrous slip of design. Around 900 BC it became very popular in Athens and different motifs; such as abstract animals and humans began to appear. Among the popular shapes for geometric pottery are:
 Circles
 Checkers
 Triangles
 Zigzags
 Meander (art)

Lustrous painted wares

Lustrous painted wares slowly rise in popularity throughout the Late Helladic period until eventually they are the most popular for of painted wares. There are four distinct forms of lustrous decorations:
 The first style sees the ware covered entirely with brilliant decoration, with red or white matte paint underneath.
 This form consists of wares with a yellower tone with black lustrous decorations.
 In the third style, the yellow clay becomes paler and floral and marine motifs in black paint are popular.
 The final style has matte red clay with a less lustrous black paint. Human and animal decorations that are geometric in form.

Fine wares vs. common wares

Fine wares are made from well purified clay of a buff color. They have thin, hard walls and a smooth, well polished slip. The paint is generally lustrous and the decorations can be: 
 Birds
 Fish
 Animals (commonly oxen and horses)
 Humans

This form of ware is generally of a high class; making it more expensive and elite.

Common wares are plain and undecorated wares used for everyday tasks. They are made from a red coarse and porous clay and often contain grit to prevent cracking. Later on in the Helladic period the tendency to decorate even common wares surfaces.

Pattern vs. pictorial style

Pattern

The pattern style is characterized by motifs such as:
 scales
spirals
chevrons
octopuses
shells
flowers

Throughout the Late Helladic era, the patterns become more and more simplified until they are little more than calligraphic squiggles. The vase painter would cover the majority of the vase with horizontal bands, applied while the pottery was still on the wheel. There is a distinct lack of invention in this form of decoration.

Pictorial

The majority of pictorial pottery has been found on Cyprus, but it originates in the Peloponnese. It is most likely copied or inspired from the palace frescoes but the vase painters lacked the ability at this time to recreate the fluidity of the art.

The most common shape for this form of decoration are large jars, providing a larger surface for the decoration; usually chariot scenes.

Issues of art history

Wace noted even in the first publication of Documents that a conflict had developed over the interpretation of Mycenaean artifacts in the history of Greek art. Schliemann had believed that the Mycenaeans were Greeks. Wace described him as "overawed" by critics penning their views under the facade of expertise into not fully publishing his views. The gist of their arguments was that Mycenaean art was completely different from classical art. The Mycenaeans were most likely easterners, perhaps Phoenicians. Greek art really begins in the Geometric Period about 1000 BC. At that time the slate was wiped clean, so to speak. All culture became suddenly different, writing was lost completely, and previous art styles came to a swift end. They explained this hypothetical change as the first entry of the Greeks into Greece at that time. Wace termed this view "orthodox" because any other was speculative and unsupported by any certain evidence.

Even Ventris when he first began his analysis of the script never suspected that it was Greek. When he began to consider the triplets of Alice Kober, a classics major from New York City, linguist, and voracious scholar, who also had taught herself braille, and had received a Guggenheim Fellowship to study Linear B, he was able to match some words with Cretan place names and objects depicted in the ideograms. A triplet was a group of three sequences of signs exactly the same except for the final syllables. Kober had hypothesized that the last signs were the endings of an inflected word.
Her death in 1950 of cancer, just when Ventris was beginning his work, prevented her from going further.

In a flash of insight Ventris realized that some of the words could be interpreted as Cretan place names and material objects matching their depictions in the ideograms. He had developed a grid, or table of unknown vowels in rows and unknown consonants in columns. At each intersection of a vowel row and a consonant column was a CV syllable to be matched with a sign. Once the syllabic value for a sign was known, the vowel and the consonant were known and could be applied to the other intersections in the grid. The place names gave him enough syllabic values to see that the language is Greek written in syllabic characters. It was suggested that he contact John Chadwick, a linguist and classics professor at Cambridge, who had been a code-breaker of another syllabic writing system, Japanese, in World War II. Chadwick and peers at Cambridge had been trying to "break" Linear B as an exercise. Linear B was already broken, but Chadwick and Ventris became fast friends and collaborators.

The reaction of the established scholarly world was somewhat less than sanguine. The idea of Mycenaeans being Greeks, as Schliemann had suggested, was abhorrent to them, as it was bringing a role reversal to the former "experts." Resistance went on for decades, but the preponderance of evidence eventually gave the decipherment of Linear B an inevitable certainty. Currently no one seriously denies that Linear B is Greek writing.

One implication is that the pottery and other cultural features associated with Linear B are Greek also. Even Evans resisted that conclusion, suggesting instead that the Greeks adopted Minoan cultural features, instead of bringing their own gifts to the banquet of history, so to speak. Mycenae after all is not a native Greek word. In opposition, the archaeologists accepting the decipherment developed a theory that the Greeks or the speakers of a predecessor language, had entered Greece at the beginning of the Middle Bronze Age, overrunning and incorporating the pre-Greek speakers, who had given Mycenae its name, this event being reflected in the shaft graves at Mycenae. The Late Bronze Age was thus a floruit of Greek imperial domination, which Tsountas and others were now calling "The Mycenaean Age."

Society and culture
Submycenaean is now generally regarded as the final stage of Late Helladic IIIC (and perhaps not even a very significant one), and is followed by Protogeometric pottery (1050/25–900 BC). Archaeological evidence for a Dorian invasion at any time between 1200 and 900 BC is absent, nor can any pottery style be associated with the Dorians.

Dendrochronological and C14 evidence for the start of the Protogeometric period now indicates this should be revised upwards to at least 1070 BC, if not earlier.

The remnants of Mycenaean pottery allow archaeologists to date the site they have excavated. With the estimated time of the site, this allows historians to develop timelines that contribute to the understanding of ancient civilization. Furthermore, with the extraction of pottery, historians can determine the different classes of people depending on where the pottery shards were taken from. Due to the large amount of trading the Mycenae people did, tracking whom they traded with can determine the extent of their power and influence in their society and others. Historians then can learn the importance of who the Mycenae people were, where pottery mainly comes from, who was reigning at that time and the different economic standards.

Historians don't know why the power of dominance changed from the Minoans to the Mycenaes, but much of the influence of pottery comes from the Minoans' culture. Shapes as well as design are direct influences from the Minoans. The Mycenae didn't change the design of their pottery all that much, but the development of the stirrup jar became a  huge influence on other communities. Fresco paintings became an influence on the pictures painted on the pottery. Most of these images depict the warlike attitude of the Mycenae; as well, animals became a common feature painted on the pottery.

Through the excavation of tombs in Greece, archaeologists believe that much of the pottery found belongs to the upper class. Pottery was seen as slave work or that of the lower class. Graves with few pots or vessels indicate the burial was for a poorer family; these are usually not of much worth and are less elaborate then that of the higher class. Pottery was used for ceremonies or gifts to other rulers in the Mycenaean cities.

For historians to decipher what pottery was used for, they have to look for different physical characteristics that would indicate what it was used for. Some indicators can be:
 Where the pottery was extracted from (i.e., houses, graves, temples)
 Dimension and shape: what the capacity is, stability, manipulation and how easy it is to extract its content
 Surface wear: scratches, pits or chips resulting from stirring, carrying, serving and washing
 Soot deposit: if it was used for cooking

Pottery was mainly used for the storage of water, wine and olive oil and for cooking. Pottery was also "used as a prestige object to display success or power". Most grave sites contain pottery to serve as a passing into another life. Along with burial rituals and gifts, pottery was widely traded.

Much of the Mycenae's wealth came from the trading they did along the coast of the Mediterranean. When power passed from the Minoans to the Mycenae, Crete and Rhodes became major trading points. Trading eventually moved further north, as far as Mount Olympus. With the growing power and influence, trading went as far as Egypt, Sicily, and the coast of Italy. Other sites where pottery was discovered are Baltic, Asia Minor, Spain, and most of the Aegean. Another society that the Mycenae traded with were the Neolithic. Around 1250 BC, the Mycenae combined forces to take over Troy due to high taxation of ships through the channel among other reasons. With the coming of the Bronze Age Collapse, famine became more prevalent and many families moved to places closer to food production around the Eastern Mediterranean. With a declining population, production of pottery also declined. Pottery did not become a lost art form like many others, but it became more rugged.

With the establishment of trade, prices were agreed upon before ships were sent out. Other materials such as olive oil, wine, fabrics and copper were traded.

See also

Cycladic chronology
Cypriot Bichrome ware
Helladic chronology
Helladic period
Minoan chronology
Minyan ware

Notes

References

  Chadwick's second edition includes the first edition by Chadwick and Michael Ventris, which is considered the "Constitution" of Linear B studies. It contains a Foreword by A. J. B. Wace, deceased by the second edition.
 
 
 
 
 
 A. Furumark, Mycenaean Pottery I: Analysis and Classification (Stockholm 1941, 1972)
 Reynold Higgins. Minoan and Mycenaean Art. (London, 1967)
 Kleiner, Fred S. Gardner's Art Through the Ages. (Boston, 2010)
 
 Spyridon Marinatos. Crete and Mycenae. (London, 1960)
 P. A. Mountjoy, Mycenaean Decorated Pottery: A Guide to Identification (Göteborg 1986)
Mycenaean Pictorial Art and Pottery
  Includes a Preface by William Ewart Gladstone, then MP.
 Lord William Taylour. The Mycenaeans. (London, 1964)

Further reading
Betancourt, Philip P. 2007. Introduction to Aegean Art. Philadelphia: INSTAP Academic Press. 
Preziosi, Donald, and Louise A. Hitchcock. 1999. Aegean Art and Architecture. Oxford: Oxford University Press.
Karageorghis, V. "Deux peintres de vases « mycéniens »", in: Syria 34 (1-2), 1957, pp. 81–92

External links

Pottery
Ancient Greek vase-painting styles
Ancient Greek pottery